Thérèse Quentin (5 July 1929 – 20 February 2015) was a French actress. She was married to the actor and stage director Marcel Cuvelier (1924–2015), with whom she had a daughter, actress Marie Cuvelier.

Filmography

 Les Aventuriers (1967, directed by Robert Enrico) as the aunt, Madame Dubreuil
 Le Grand Meaulnes (1967, directed by Jean-Gabriel Albicocco) as Madame Seurel
 L'Enlèvement (1973, TV Movie, directed by Jean L'Hôte) as Madame Corbier
 Voyage en Grande Tartarie (1974, directed by Jean-Charles Tacchella), as a friend at the funeral
 Madame Bovary (1974, TV Movie, by Pierre Cardinal) as Madame Homais
 Les Rosenberg ne doivent pas mourir (1975, TV Movie, directed by Stellio Lorenzi) as Madame Harris
 Je suis Pierre Rivière (1976, directed by Christine Lipinska) as the mother
 Commissaire Moulin (1976, TV Series) as La femme de Pinocchio
 Hôtel Baltimore (1976, TV Movie, directed by Alexandre Arcady) as Madame Oxenham
 Diabolo menthe (1977, directed by Diane Kurys) as Mademoiselle Dumas
 Cinéma 16 (1977-1978, TV Series) as La directrice du lycée / La bouchère, la patronne du café, l'employée de l'ANPE, la suiveuse
 Les Dossiers de l'écran (1978, TV Series, directed by Alexandre Astruc) as the cook
 Il y a longtemps que je t'aime (1979, directed by Jean Charles Tacchella) as Marie-Jeanne, the wife of Christian
 La Dérobade (1979, directed by Daniel Duval)
 Les 400 coups de Virginie (1979-1980, TV Mini-Series, directed by Bernard Queysanne) as Mme Lecran
 Nous te mari-e-rons (1981, TV Movie, directed by Jacques Fansten) as Gisèle
 Les Amours des années grises (1982, TV Series, directed by Marlène Bertin and Stéphane Bertin) as Madame d'Aunay
 Les Amours des années grises (1982, TV Series, directed by Marion Sarraut) as Madame d'Aunay
 La Tendresse (1982, TV Movie, directed by Bernard Queysanne) as Thérèse
 Sans un mot (1982, TV Movie, directed by Gérard Poitou-Weber) as the mayor's wife
 Après tout ce qu'on a fait pour toi (1982, TV Movie, directed by Jacques Fansten)
 Les Enquêtes du commissaire Maigret (1984–1985, TV Series) as Madame Pardon
 Espionne et tais-toi (1986, TV Series, directed by Claude Boissol) as Helena Mechanik
 Le Squale (1991, TV Series, directed by Claude Boissol) as Séverine's mother
 Halal police d'État (2011, directed by Rachid Dhibou) as Mme Granger
 My Little Princess (2011, directed by Eva Ionesco) as Vieille dame église
 The Chef (2012, directed by Daniel Cohen) as Résidente
 In the Shadow of Women (2015, directed by Philippe Garrel) as Henri's wife

Theatre 
 1965 : Archiflore by Jeannine Worms, directed by Nicolas Bataille, Grand Guignol
 1968 : La Leçon by Eugène Ionesco, directed by Jacques Mauclair, Carcassonne Festival, Collioure Festival, Théâtre du Midi
 1969 : Exit the King by Eugène Ionesco, directed by Jacques Mauclair, Bellac Festival
 1970 : Exit the King by Eugène Ionesco, directed by Jacques Mauclair, Théâtre de l'Athénée
 1977 : Iphigénie-Hôtel by Michel Vinaver, directed by Antoine Vitez, Théâtre des Quartiers d’Ivry
 1980 : Pour l'amour de l'humanité by Marcel Cuvelier, directed by Jean-Christian Grinevald and Marcel Cuvelier, Théâtre Marie Stuart
 1982 : Spectacle Ionesco by Eugène Ionesco, directed by Roger Planchon, TNP Villeurbanne, Théâtre de l'Odéon in 1984
 1986 : Rhapsodie-Béton by Georges Michel, directed by Marcel Cuvelier, Théâtre de la Huchette
 1990 : Comme tu me veux by Luigi Pirandello, directed by Maurice Attias, Théâtre de la Madeleine
 1996 : Théâtre en miettes by Eugène Ionesco, directed by Marcel Cuvelier, Théâtre de la Huchette
 1999 : Le Domaine des femmes by Anton Chekhov, directed by Marcel Cuvelier, Théâtre de la Huchette
 2002 : Histoires de On by Jean-Claude Grumberg, directed by Marcel Cuvelier, Théâtre de la Huchette
 Le Point de vue d'Emmy by David Hare, directed by Bernard Murat, Tournée
 Je ne me souviens plus de rien by Arthur Miller, Théâtre du Tourtour
 Lillian, Théâtre du Tourtour
 Le Belvédère by Ödön von Horváth, directed by A. Alexis, Théâtre de Gennevilliers
 Douce Nuit by H. Huller, directed by Alexis Barsacq
 Vinci avait raison by Roland Topor
 Equus, Théâtre de l'Athénée
 Hotel Baltimore, directed by Alexandre Arcady, Espace Cardin
 L'Augmentation by Georges Perec, Théâtre de la Gaîté
 Demain une fenêtre sur rue by Jean-Claude Grumberg
 Premier Avertissement by August Strindberg, Théâtre des Champs-Élysées
 Oblomov by Ivan Goncharov, directed by Marcel Cuvelier, Théâtre des Champs-Élysées
 L'Homme du destin by George Bernard Shaw, Théâtre de l'Alliance française
 La Grande Catherine by George Bernard Shaw, Théâtre de l'Alliance française
 Scabreuse Aventure by Dostoievski, Théâtre du Vieux-Colombier
 La Buanderie, Théâtre de la Huchette
 The Bald Soprano and La Leçon by Eugène Ionesco, Théâtre de la Huchette
 La Lettre perdue by Courgiale, Théâtre de Poche
 Le Jeu de l'amour et de la mort by Rollaud, Théâtre de Poche

References

External links
 Roles played by Thérèse Quentin
 

2015 deaths
1929 births
French film actresses
French television actresses
People from Ixelles
20th-century French actresses
21st-century French actresses
French stage actresses